Quercus corrugata is a species of oak found in Central America and Mexico.

Description
Quercus corrugata is a large deciduous tree, growing up to 60 meters tall. It has long straight trunk which can reach 2.5 meters in diameter. It has very large acorns, which are produced in large quantities during episodic mast-seeding events.

Range and habitat
Quercus corrugata ranges from southern Mexico thorugh Central America to western Panama.

In Mexico it is found in the southern Sierra Madre Oriental of Hidalgo, Veracruz, and Puebla states through the Sierra Madre de Oaxaca, Sierra de los Tuxtlas, Chiapas Highlands, and Sierra Madre de Chiapas. In Central America it is found in the Sierra Madre de Chiapas of Guatemala and El Salvador, the Guatemalan Highlands, the Maya Mountains of Belize, the Chortis Highlands of Honduras and Nicaragua, and the Cordillera de Talamanca of Costa Rica and western Panama.

It inhabits humid montane cloud forests between 700 and 2,200 meters elevation.

References

corrugata
Oaks of Mexico
Trees of Central America
Cloud forest flora of Mexico
Flora of the Central American pine–oak forests
Flora of the Central American montane forests
Flora of the Chiapas Highlands
Flora of Los Tuxtlas
Flora of the Sierra Madre Oriental
Flora of the Sierra Madre de Oaxaca
Sierra Madre de Chiapas
Flora of the Talamancan montane forests
Plants described in 1842